Stephen and Charles Smith House is a historic home located at Roslyn Harbor in Nassau County, New York.  It was built about 1860 and is a -story timber frame dwelling with a -story ell in a vernacular Italianate style.  It features a full-width porch on the front elevation.  From 1892 to 1914, it was the property of Nora Godwin, granddaughter of William Cullen Bryant.

It was added to the National Register of Historic Places in 1999.

References

Roslyn Harbor, New York
Houses on the National Register of Historic Places in New York (state)
Italianate architecture in New York (state)
Houses completed in 1860
Houses in Nassau County, New York
National Register of Historic Places in Nassau County, New York